The Canada U-20 men's national soccer team (also known as Canada Under-20s or Canada U-20s) represents Canada in international soccer at this age level. They are overseen by the Canadian Soccer Association, the governing body for soccer in Canada. 

It plays a large role in the development of Canadian soccer, and is considered to be the feeder team for the Canada men's national soccer team. The team has qualified for eight out of nineteen FIFA U-20 World Cups. Their best result came in 2003 where they reached the quarterfinals.

The team also competes in the CONCACAF U-20 Championship, which they won in 1986 and 1996.

Canada's most significant accomplishments at youth level are winning the CONCACAF U-20 Championship and Francophone Games twice, reaching quarterfinals of the 2003 FIFA U-20 World Cup, and defeating Brazil U-20 2-1 in a friendly on May 19, 2006, at Commonwealth Stadium in Edmonton, Alberta.

Team history

1976–1996
Canada's Under-20 soccer team was created in 1976 as Canada's response to the newly created World youth Championship. The team failed to qualify for the inaugural tournament in 1977 in Tunisia, but they qualified for the following tournament two years later in Japan. They finished last in their group with two points, but they did manage to defeat Portugal 3–1. The next time the team qualified for a World youth Championship was in 1985, in the USSR, again they came last in their group with only one point. In the 1987 WYC in Chile, Canada's Under-20 soccer team put up a good effort scoring four goals, and tying Italy, however they still did not manage to get out of the group stage.

1997–2004
In 1997, after failing to qualify for four World Youth Championships (as the event was known until 2005) in a row, Canada made it past the group stage. The team progressed to the second round after a 2–1 win against Hungary in which a young Dwayne De Rosario scored a goal. They lost the round of 16 game against Spain 2–0. After missing the tournament in 1999, Canada qualified for Argentina 2001 after winning the qualifying tournament based on home soil in Vancouver, British Columbia. At the finals, they finished last and were eliminated from a group including Brazil, Germany and Iraq.

Canada once again appeared in the 2003 FIFA World Youth Championship in United Arab Emirates. They qualified to the round of 16 where they blanked Burkina Faso 1–0, and in a rematch against 1997 conquerors Spain, Canada lost in the quarter finals. Iain Hume scored three goals for Canada including a direct free kick against Spain while Atiba Hutchinson was an impressive performer in midfield.

2005–present
At the 2005 FIFA World Youth Championships in the Netherlands, Canada were eliminated in the group stage after tying once and losing twice. One bright side of the tournament was Jaime Peters' and Marcel De Jong's goals.

In the build-up to the 2007 FIFA U-20 World Cup, as the tournament came to be known, Canada's defeated Brazil in the first game of a three-game series, winning 2- in front of 14 000+ at Commonwealth Stadium in Edmonton on May 19, 2006. David Edgar and Will Johnson scored and Stephen Lumley made goal-line clearance to preserve Canada's first win over a Brazilian men's team at any level. Canada lost the remaining two matches 3–1. Despite an impressive run in friendlies leading up to the competition, Canada went winless in first round play without scoring a goal on home soil.

Fixtures and recent results

The following is a list of match results from the previous 12 months, as well as any future matches that have been scheduled.

2022

Players

Current squad
The following 20 players were called up for the 2022 CONCACAF Men's U20 Championship that will be hosted in Honduras, in the cities of San Pedro Sula and Tegucigalpa from June 18 to July 3, 2022.

Caps and goals as of June 26, 2022, after the match against Guatemala U20 team.

Recent call-ups
The following players have been called up for the team within the last twelve months.

  = Alternate player
  = Injured player
  = Preliminary squad

Competitive record

FIFA U-20 World Cup

CONCACAF U-20 Championship

Jeux de la Francophonie

Honours
 CONCACAF U-20 Championship
 Winners (2): 1986, 1996
 Runners-up (2): 1978, 1984 
 Third place (3): 1992, 1994, 2001 
 Football at the Jeux de la Francophonie
 Winners (2): 1989, 1997

See also

 Canada men's national soccer team
 Canada men's national under-23 soccer team
 Canada men's national under-17 soccer team
 Canada men's national futsal team
 Soccer in Canada

References

External links
 Canucks Abroad
 Canadian Soccer Association

Under-20
North American national under-20 association football teams